The 2011 Knoxville Challenger was a professional tennis tournament played on hard courts. It was the eighth edition of the tournament which is part of the 2011 ATP Challenger Tour. It took place in Knoxville, United States between 8 and 13 November 2011.

Singles main-draw entrants

Seeds

 1 Rankings are as of October 31, 2011.

Other entrants
The following players received wildcards into the singles main draw:
  Denis Kudla
  Tennys Sandgren
  John-Patrick Smith
  Rhyne Williams

The following players received entry as an alternate into the singles main draw:
  Jamie Baker
  Pierre-Ludovic Duclos

The following players received entry as a special exempt into the singles main draw:
  Jesse Levine

The following players received entry from the qualifying draw:
  Brian Baker
  Mirza Bašić
  Steve Johnson
  Dimitar Kutrovsky

Champions

Singles

 Jesse Levine def.  Brian Baker, 6–2, 6–3

Doubles

 Steve Johnson /  Austin Krajicek def.  Adam Hubble /  Frederik Nielsen, 3–6, 6–4, [13–11]

External links
Official Website
ITF Search 
ATP official site

Knoxville Challenger
Knoxville Challenger
Knoxville Challenger
2011 in American tennis